A Very School Gyrls Holla-Day is the second and final album by American girl group School Gyrls released in the U.S. on December 14, 2010. It was preceded by the single "Going to the Mall".

Background
After their second television film, "A Very School Gyrls Holla-Day", was released, the girls released their second full-length studio album. The group promoted the album by performing the only single "Going to the Mall" at various locations. The album was only released in the United States, with no plans for the album to be released in any other territories. This is also the final album that features two out of three original members of the School Gyrls, Mandy Rain and Jacque Nimble.

Commercial performance
Unlike their previous album, School Gyrls, the album failed to chart in any territories in the world.

Track listing
"Going to the Mall" – 3:29
"We Wish You a Merry Christmas" – 3:02
"O Christmas Tree" – 2:37
"12 Days" – 3:30
"Party Bag" – 2:29
"Jingle Bells" (featuring Aaron Fresh) – 2:55
"Deck the Halls" – 2:34

Release history

References

School Gyrls albums
2010 albums
Island Records albums